Elijah Nicholas Wilson (April 8, 1842 - December 26, 1915) was known as "Yagaiki" when among the Shoshones, and in his later years as "Uncle Nick" when entertaining young children with his adventurous exploits. He was a Mormon American pioneer, childhood runaway, "adopted" brother of Shoshone Chief Washakie, Pony Express rider for the Central Overland California and Pikes Peak Express Company, stagecoach driver for Ben Holloday's Overland Stage, blacksmith, prison guard, farmer, Mormon bishop, prison inmate (unlawful cohabitation), carpenter/cabinet maker, fiddler, trader, trapper, and "frontier doctor" (diphtheria and smallpox).

Wilson is remembered today due to the publication of derivative works based upon, and later-day republications of, his 1910 autobiography entitled Among the Shoshones, such as The White Indian Boy: The Story of Uncle Nick Among the Shoshones (a volume of the World Book Company's In Pioneer Life Series), The White Indian Boy, and its sequel The Return of the White Indian. He founded Wilson, Wyoming. His life was highlighted in the 2000 movie Wind River.

References

External links

 

1842 births
1915 deaths
American memoirists
American autobiographers
Writers from Illinois
Mormon pioneers
American leaders of the Church of Jesus Christ of Latter-day Saints
People convicted of cohabitation
Pony Express riders
American people convicted of bigamy
Latter Day Saints from Wyoming